The Sydney Writers' Festival is an annual literary festival held in Sydney, with the inaugural festival taking place in 1997. The 2020 event was cancelled due to the COVID-19 pandemic in Australia.

The festival's interim artistic director since August 2020 is Michael Williams.

History
The festival began in January 1997, with most events initially held at the State Library of New South Wales. The first independent Sydney Writers' Festival ran from 12 to 17 May 1998, with 169 participants appearing in venues in, and around, the centre of Sydney.

Since then, the Festival has rapidly expanded. The Festival moved from Walsh Bay to Carriageworks in May 2018 (Walsh Bay is undergoing a major refurbishment). Events were also held at venues stretching across Sydney, from the City Recital Hall and Sydney Town Hall in the city centre, into suburban Sydney and the Blue Mountains.

Held mid-to-late May each year, the Festival now involves over 400 participants and presents over 300 events in renovated piers at Walsh Bay. Other festival locations include Roslyn Packer Theatre, Sydney Town Hall, City Recital Hall, and Sydney Opera House. Events are also regularly held in regional and suburban locations including Parramatta, Ashfield, Auburn, Blacktown, Bankstown, Campbelltown, Hornsby, Penrith, the Blue Mountains and Wollongong.

Approximately one-third of all Sydney Writers' Festival events are free of charge. Festival attendances have reached over 90,000 each year since 2007.

The 2020 event was cancelled due to the COVID-19 pandemic in Australia.

Sydney Writers' Festival Limited is a not-for-profit company with an independent board of directors. The chairs of the festival have been:
1997–2000: Geraldine Doogue
Late 2000–Dec 2011: Sandra Yates 
Jan 2012–Jan 2018:  Deena Shiff
Feb 2018– : Mark Scott

Artistic directors for festival years:
1998: John Nieuwenhuizen, with Meredith Curnow the Program Director. Meredith Curnow became Festival Director for the period *1999–2002: Meredith Curnow
2003–2006: Caro Llewellyn (AD & CEO)
2007-2009: Wendy Were (AD & CEO)
2010–2012: Chip Rolley
2013–2016: Jemma Birrell
2017–2020: Michaela McGuire (appointed November 2016)
2021– 2022 : Michael Williams, interim director (since August 2020)
2022– : Ann Mossop

Executive directors & other CEOs:
2009–2014: Ben Strout
2015: Jo Dyer ED from 2015; promoted to CEO in November 2016, when she also joined the Festival board of directors.
2018–2021: Chrissy Sharp, CEO 
2021–  Brooke Webb

Past international guests
Past guests have included:
1999 – Alan Duff, and Peter Porter
2002 – Jodi Picoult, Lloyd Jones, Giles Milton and Neil Hanson
2003 – Antony Beevor, Jonathan Franzen, Catherine Millet, Janette Turner Hospital, Nicholas Shakespeare, and CK Stead
2004 – Alan Bennett, Alain de Botton, Hilary Mantel, Tim Krabbe, Susanna Moore, Jane Campion, Louis de Bernières, Salam Pax, John W. Dean, Harvey Pekar, Alexei Sayle, ZZ Packer, and David Sedaris
2005 – Lewis Lapham, Alan Hollinghurst, Deirdre Bair, Professor Harold Bloom, Tariq Ali, David Suzuki, Jared Diamond, Suad Amiry, Michael Winter, Colin McAdam and Miriam Toews
2006 – Naomi Wolf, Anna Politkovskaya, Michael Burleigh, Andy Borowitz, Susan Orlean, Aleksandar Hemon, Hendrik Hertzberg, Mark Danner, Haifa Zangana, John Banville, Edmund White, and Maya Angelou
2007 – Andrew O'Hagan, Ayaan Hirsi Ali, Bei Dao, Will Hutton, Antony Beevor, William Dalyrmple, Lionel Shriver, Richard Ford, Andrei Makine, Rachel Seiffert, Mohsin Hamid and Steven Hall
2008 – Jon Lee Anderson, Andrew J. Bacevich, Michael Pollan, John Gray, and Jeanette Winterson
2009 – Chimamanda Ngozi Adichie, Alex Ross, and Kazuo Ishiguro
2010 – John Carey, Colm Tóibín, Lionel Shriver, Yiyun Li, John Ralston Saul, Bill McKibben, and Raj Patel
2011 – Ingrid Betancourt, Howard Jacobson, A. A. Gill, Anthony Bourdain, Téa Obreht, Izzeldin Abuelaish, Kei Miller, Kader Abdolah, Michael Cunningham, David Mitchell, AC Grayling, Michael Connelly, Gail Dines, and Daniel Altman
2012 – Hisham Matar, Jeffrey Eugenides, Dava Sobel
2013 – Molly Ringwald, Ruby Wax, Claire Messud
2014 – Irvine Welsh, Vince Gilligan, Alice Walker
2015 – Michael Connelly, Anthony Horowitz, Douglas Coupland, Norman Doidge, Alan Cumming, Atul Gawande, David Walliams, Michael Frayn, James Patterson (out of season event)
2016 – Gloria Steinem, Jonathan Franzen, Marlon James, Julian Barnes, William Boyd, Jeanette Winterson, Kae Tempest, Yanis Varoufakis, Hanya Yanagihara, Paul Muldoon, Yeonmi Park
2017 – Anne Enright, Henry Marsh, Ian Rankin, George Saunders, A. N. Wilson
2018 – André Aciman, Min Jin Lee, Alexis Okeowo, Masha Gessen, Jennifer Egan, Tayari Jones
2019 – Fatima Bhutto, Rachel Kushner, Susan Orlean, George Saunders, Nana Kwame Adjei–Brenyah, Meg Wolitzer, Akala, Andrew Sean Greer, Alexander Chee

Past local guests
1997 – Robert Dessaix, Andrew McGahan, Matthew Condon, Bernard Cohen, Christos Tsiolkas, Gillian Mears
2001 – Lee Tulloch
2002 – Geoffrey Atherden, Bernard Cohen
2003 – Sonya Hartnett, David Malouf, Danny Katz, Louis Nowra
2005 – Bob Carr and John Kinsella
2006 – Alex Miller, Robert Drewe, Kate Grenville, Les Murray, Tegan Bennett Daylight, Peter Singer, Tim Flannery, Gail Jones
2007 – Raimond Gaita
2008 – Mem Fox, Peter van Onselen, Michelle de Kretser, Gail Jones, Drusilla Modjeska
2009 – Elizabeth Farrelly
2010 – Peter Carey, Les Murray, Alex Miller, Ross Garnaut, Clive Hamilton
2011 – Suelette Dreyfus, Annette Shun Wah, David Hicks
2012 – Kathy Lette
2013 – Brendan Cowell, Elizabeth Farrelly, Claudia Karvan, 
2014 – Christos Tsiolkas, Michelle de Kretser, Robert Dessaix
2015 – Richard Flanagan, Annabel Crabb, Leigh Sales, Helen Garner, David Malouf, Les Murray, Andy Griffiths, Julia Gillard
2016 – Elizabeth Harrower, Anna Funder, Magda Szubanski, Stan Grant, Kerry O'Brien, Bob Brown, Charlotte Wood
2017 – Julia Baird, Jimmy Barnes, Peter Corris, Clementine Ford, Liane Moriarty
2018 – Michelle de Kretser, Jane Harper, Helen Garner, Christos Tsiolkas, Julia Gillard

Closing address
2011 James Gleick 'Perish the thought'
2012 Dava Sobel
2013 Claire Messud
2014 Emma Donoghue
2015 Helen Macdonald
2016 Hanya Yanagihara
2017 Susan Faludi
2018 Jennifer Egan
2019 Fatima Bhutto

Organisational structure
The festival is led by CEO Brooke Webb and programmed by the Artistic Director, Michael Williams.

 the directors of the Festival are:

Mark Scott (Chair)
Kathy Shand (Deputy Chair)
Nikki Christer
Annabel Crabb
Michael Dagostino
Amelia Lester
Sheila McGregor
Su-Ming Wong

See also
List of festivals in Australia
New South Wales Premier's Literary Awards
Man Booker International Prize – 2011
Sydney Writers Walk

References

External links
Official Sydney Writers' Festival Site
Sydney Writers' Festival – Katoomba Program

Literary festivals in Australia
Festivals in Sydney
Festivals established in 1997
1997 establishments in Australia